Anomis gentilis is a moth species in the family Erebidae. It is found in North America.

The MONA or Hodges number for Anomis gentilis is 8552.

References

Further reading

 
 
 

Scoliopteryginae
Articles created by Qbugbot
Moths described in 1912